The 1992 Damallsvenskan was the fifth season of the Damallsvenskan. Matches were played between 17 April and 3 October 1992. Öxabäck/Mark IF won the league by one point from Gideonsbergs IF. Malmö FF finished third. In the playoffs, Gideonsbergs IF won the title. This was the only time that the Damallsvenskan and the playoffs had different winners. 

The two teams promoted before the season were Lindsdals IF and Älvsjö AIK. The relegated teams were Djurgården and Sundsvall DFF.

Table

Playoffs

Results of the playoffs are not known. The champions were Gideonsbergs IF.

External links
 bolletinen.se

Damallsvenskan seasons
1992 in association football
1992 in Swedish sport